R-type asteroids are moderately bright, relatively uncommon inner-belt asteroids that are spectrally intermediate between the V and A-type asteroids.  The spectrum shows distinct olivine and pyroxene features at 1 and 2 micrometres, with a possibility of plagioclase. Shortwards of 0.7 μm the spectrum is very reddish.

The IRAS mission has classified 4 Vesta, 246 Asporina, 349 Dembowska, 571 Dulcinea and 937 Bethgea as type R; however, the re-classification of Vesta, the V archetype, is debatable.  Of these bodies, only 349 Dembowska is recognized as being type R when all wavelengths are taken into account.

List
As of February 2019, at least 5 asteroids have been classified as R-type:

References

See also
Asteroid spectral types

Asteroid spectral classes
R-type asteroids